Levocabastine (trade name Livostin or Livocab, depending on the region) is a selective second-generation H1 receptor antagonist which was discovered at Janssen Pharmaceutica in 1979. It is used for allergic conjunctivitis.

As well as acting as an antihistamine, levocabastine has also subsequently been found to act as a potent and selective antagonist for the neurotensin receptor NTS2, and was the first drug used to characterise the different neurotensin subtypes. This has made it a useful tool for the study of this receptor.

The pharmaceutical drug Bilina is a combination of Levocabastine, benzalkonium chloride, and other components and is typically used in a 0.5 mg/ml suspension as eye-drops, dispensed in 4ml bottles for the treatment of allergic conjunctivitis or similar allergic ocular conditions.

References

External links 
 
 

Belgian inventions
H1 receptor antagonists
Janssen Pharmaceutica
Nitriles
Fluoroarenes
4-Phenylpiperidines